Law Pak (born 25 May 1933) is a former football coach and former Republic of China (Taiwan) international footballer. However, he spent his entire playing career in the British Hong Kong. As a coach, he coached teams from Hong Kong and Taiwan; he also resided in Taiwan temporary but in recent year followed his daughter to migrate to the United States.

In 2014, during an interview, he claimed that himself, Mok Chun Wah and Lau Tim were the only surviving gold medalists of the 1958 Asian Games football tournament.

Club career
Law was a player of KMB in the 1950s. He was also employed by the owner of the football club, Kowloon Motor Bus, as a bus station manager, according to an interview of Law by John C.W. Lee. At that time the footballer were registered as amateur footballer but in fact professional, receiving income from various source.

International career
Law represented the Republic of China (Taiwan) in the 1958 Asian Games, the 1960 Summer Olympics, the 1960 AFC Asian Cup, the 1966 Asian Games and the 1968 AFC Asian Cup.

Law also played for Hong Kong League XI in 1958 Merdeka Tournament.

Managing career
Law had managed Hong Kong football clubs Yuen Long and Eastern. With Eastern, he was assisted by Koo Luam Khen who acted as coach. He also spent over 10 years in Taiwan for Flying Camel, a military sponsored club. During his career at Taiwan, he also guest coached Republic of China (Taiwan), which the team played under the name "Chinese Taipei" due to the foreign relation of Taiwan as well as the People's Republic of China.

Honours

Republic of China
Asian Games Gold medal: 1958

References

External links
 
 

Hong Kong footballers
Taiwanese footballers
Hong Kong football managers
Taiwanese football managers
Eastern Sports Club football managers
Hong Kong First Division League players
Footballers at the 1960 Summer Olympics
Footballers at the 1958 Asian Games
Medalists at the 1958 Asian Games
Asian Games gold medalists for Chinese Taipei
1960 AFC Asian Cup players
1968 AFC Asian Cup players
Olympic footballers of Taiwan
Chinese Taipei international footballers
Chinese Taipei international footballers from Hong Kong
Living people
1933 births
Asian Games medalists in football
Association football defenders
Chinese Taipei national football team managers